Shimul Yousuf (born 24 March 1957) is a Bangladeshi actress, director and singer. She was awarded the Ekushey Padak, the second most important award for civilians in Bangladesh in 2023.

Early life
Yousuf was born in Dhaka on 24 March 1957 and is the youngest of seven siblings. Odissi dancer Minu Haque is her sister. Her father Mehter Billah from Bikrampur was a singer in Kamlapur. Shimul started singing at the age of five. She performed on radio and television and went on to sing in a children show named "Kochi Kanchar Mela". She trained in classical and traditional songs from Ustad Helaluddin, P C Gomez, Altaf Mahmud, and Abdul Latif . Shimul completed her Honours in Social Science.  She was admitted to the Institute of Fine Arts and also went to Baroda School of Fine Arts for schooling.

Career
Yousuf first appeared in theater in one of the Abdullah Al Mamun's plays to raise funds for the freedom fighters in 1972. In 1974 she incorporated her in Dhaka Theatre after her siblings asked to be a proxy for another actress. Shimul began to take acting seriously after her 1975 drama "Muntasir Fantasy". She worked on Kasai (1976), Char Khakra (1977), Shakuntala (1978), Phani Monosa (1980), Kitton Khola (1981), Keramot Mongol (1985), Hat Hadai (1989), and Chaka (1990). During the 1990s she performed in Joiboti Kannyar Mon (1995) and Bono Pangshul (1998).

Binodini
One of her works in theater is the drama Binodini, based on a 19th-century actress Binodini Dasi. It is a one-person show where Yousuf portrayed the character of Binodini and also delivered the speeches of the remaining characters. The play was written by script writer Saymon Zakaria and directed by Shimul's husband, Nasiruddin Yousuff. The play mainly perpetuated the life of Binodini Dasi as she struggled to prolong her career in theater. Shimul said that "[the drama] shows the reality, the conflicts and contradiction an actress faces today, has not changed much since Binodini's time. Obviously I am affected by such realities."

Awards
 Diboshri Padak
 Lokonatto Padak
 Aronno Dipu Padak
 Rishi Padak
 Rudra Padak
 Md. Shahidullah Award
 Jahangir Award
 Prothom Alo Jorip Award
 Women's Day Special Award
 Anannya Top Ten Awards (2003)
 Bangladesh National Film Award for Best Costume Design : 2009 (Geurrilla)
 Bachsas Award for Best Music Director : 2009 (Guerrilla)
 Bachsas Award for Best Female Playback Singer : 2009 (Guerrilla)

References

1957 births
Living people
Bangladeshi stage actresses
20th-century Bangladeshi women singers
20th-century Bangladeshi singers
Bangladeshi television actresses
Bangladeshi film score composers
Bangladeshi songwriters
Bangladeshi female dancers
Bangladeshi choreographers
Bangladeshi costume designers
Best Costume Design National Film Award (Bangladesh) winners
Best Female Singer Bachsas Award winners
Recipients of the Ekushey Padak